Justin Eugene Pitcher (born 17 February 1987) is a Bermudian cricketer. Pitcher is a right-handed batsman who bowls right-arm medium-fast. He was born in Bermuda.

In 2009, Pitcher made his debut for Bermuda in a first-class match against Namibia in the 2009-10 Intercontinental Shield at the Wanderers Cricket Ground, Windhoek. Following the match he made his List A debut against the same opponents, making two appearances in that format. The following year, Pitcher made a further List A appearance against the touring United Arab Emirates, at the National Stadium, Hamilton.

In February 2012, he was selected as part of Bermuda's squad for the 2012 World Twenty20 Qualifier.

In August 2019, he was named in Bermuda's squad for the Regional Finals of the 2018–19 ICC T20 World Cup Americas Qualifier tournament. He made his Twenty20 International (T20I) debut for Bermuda against the United States on 18 August 2019. In November 2019, he was named in Bermuda's squad for the Cricket World Cup Challenge League B tournament in Oman.

References

External links
Justin Pitcher at ESPNcricinfo
Justin Pitcher at CricketArchive

1987 births
Living people
Bermudian cricketers
Bermuda Twenty20 International cricketers